Born Pink is the second studio album by South Korean girl group Blackpink, released on September 16, 2022, through YG Entertainment and Interscope Records. It marked the group's first full-length record since The Album in 2020. Production of the album was handled by various producers including Teddy Sinclair, Willy Sinclair, Bekuh Boom, R. Tee, Kush and  Teddy Park. Blackpink conceived Born Pink as "the essence" of the group, taking inspiration from hip-hop sound throughout the album and combining various genres.

Born Pinks English-heavy sound draws mostly from pop, hip-hop, rock and EDM, with melodies characterized by more uptempo production than in its predecessor The Album. The songs incorporate eclectic styles ranging from disco and bubblegum pop to pop-rock and stadium rock. Lyrically, the album discusses themes of love, self-confidence, self-encouragement, dealing with fame and detractors, and more. Blackpink members Jisoo and Rosé co-wrote the fourth track "Yeah Yeah Yeah".

Born Pink was supported by two singles, both of which reached number one on the Billboard Global 200. The pre-release single "Pink Venom" topped the national charts of 10 countries, peaking at number two on South Korea's Circle Digital Chart and at number 22 on the US Billboard Hot 100. The album's second single "Shut Down" peaked at number three on the Circle Digital Chart and at number 25 on the Billboard Hot 100. "Ready for Love", previously released as a promotional single in collaboration with battle royale video game PUBG Mobile, was also included on the tracklist. To promote the album, Blackpink embarked on the Born Pink World Tour beginning in October.

The album was met with generally favorable reviews from critics. The album's stronger production and more personal lyrics received praise; however, criticisms were made for its lack of innovation and musical development. Commercially, it debuted at number one on the Circle Album Chart with 2.2 million copies sold in less than two days, becoming the best-selling album by a female act in South Korea and the first to surpass two million sales. In the United States, it became the first album by a female group to reach number one on the Billboard 200 since Danity Kane in 2008. Additionally, Born Pink became the first album by a K-pop girl group to land atop the Billboard 200 and the UK Albums Chart, which earned Blackpink two Guinness World Records. The album has since been certified double million by the Korea Music Content Association (KMCA). The album was the eighth best-selling album worldwide in 2022.

Background
On March 7, 2022, Jennie appeared on the variety show The Game Caterers in an episode featuring YG Entertainment artists, revealing that Blackpink had been working on a new comeback: "Blackpink is also making a comeback soon, I don't know if I'm allowed to say this, but since I'm the only Blackpink member here, I'll just say it please look forward to it". In a Rolling Stone interview published on May 23, 2022, Blackpink stated that "they were working hard on the preparation of the album and that they were ready to comeback into the swing of things."

In collaboration with battle royale video game PUBG Mobile, "Ready for Love" was released as a promotional single, with an animated music video published on YouTube on July 29, 2022. On July 31, 2022, YG Entertainment officially released the album trailer video on the group's official social media accounts, announcing that the group's new world tour would start in October, following a pre-release single in August and the album itself in September. The label later confirmed that two music videos were filmed to support the album, reportedly with the highest production budgets they have ever invested into a music video. The album's pre-release single, "Pink Venom", was released on August 19. The same day, Blackpink performed the single at the 2022 MTV Video Music Awards, marking their American awards show debut and making them the first female K-pop group in history to do so. 

On September 6, 2022, the teaser poster for the title track, “Shut Down”, was released on Blackpink's social media accounts. On September 7, the album's tracklist was released, confirming that it will contain eight songs. It was further revealed that both Jisoo and Rosé participated in the writing of "Yeah Yeah Yeah".  From September 10 to 13, promotional posters of each of the members were released. On September 16, the album was released alongside the music video for "Shut Down".

Recording and development

In an interview with Newsen Rosé stated that "If The Album focused solely on music, this album tried to express the essence of Blackpink as its title 'Born Pink', where we keep trying new things while keeping our original identity. Furthermore she added: "based on the hip-hop sound throughout the album, various genres were combined, focusing on expressing the light color of Blackpink. I pride myself on creating music that we've never done before". Regarding the creative process and style for the songs, YG Entertainment stated after that "A lot of music that is Blackpink-esque has been completed with much effort over a long period of time" and that the new album was expected to include numerous tracks that "feature the band's signature music style that the members have worked on for a very long time". The label further explained that the album's title Born Pink "portrays Blackpink's confidence and self-esteem for being born different" and that the album lives up to the group's reputation and "unrivaled presence."

In an online press conference in Seoul for the release of “Pink Venom”, Jennie explained how the single was chosen to represent Blackpink's identity: "Since our album’s title is Born Pink, we wanted to relay our identity in the song as much as we could. Since ‘pink’ and ‘venom’ have contradicting images, we thought they were kind of reminiscent of us." During the group's live stream broadcast for Born Pink, Lisa shared the group's first impression of "Shut Down" and how they chose it to be the album's second single: "We listened to the demo version of 'Shut Down' in the studio, and when we first heard it, we exchanged looks and knew that this had to be the title track. I was able to sketch how we’d perform this song". She also revealed that the track is "distinctly Blackpink" and is something the band can express well.

In an article by Variety, several songwriters whose work was featured on Born Pink discussed the stories behind their contributions to the record. The writer of "Typa Girl", Bekuh Boom revealed that she had written the demo for the song in 2021 at The Black Label's studio and that she had originally "thought Lisa might use it for her next solo single". She further described it as a "song to empower women". American songwriter and producer Freddy Wexler conjured "Hard to Love" during a jam session with his friends. He sent the demo to Teddy in June 2022 and was video called by him, Lisa, and Rosé the next day. He described the song as "an overwhelmingly organic — and fast — process". Over the next month, he would FaceTime with Park and the group, who suggested changes. 

The writers of "Tally" discussed the story behind the track: "Judgment is something that a lot of women come across. These lyrics are so impactful coming from [BLACKPINK]". The song was inspired by co-writer Soraya LaPread, who brought up the subject in a session with production duo Saltwives. During the interview with Rolling Stone, LaPread confessed she worked on the song years ago and had actually forgotten about it. The producer then revealed that she only remembered the song after Australian songwriter Nat Dunn showed interest in the track and offered to buy it.  He played the demo for Brian Lee in London and later sent it to Teddy Park, who had handpicked every song on the album. Prior to its release, the recording process of "Ready for Love" was shown in the Netflix documentary, Light Up the Sky in October 2020, as it was 
cut from The Album’s final tracklist.

Record producer Ryan Tedder, who last worked with Blackpink on their debut studio album, confirmed in an interview with Good Morning America that he wrote songs with members Jennie and Rosé for the upcoming album. Describing the process, Tedder said it was very much Blackpink's work with him supporting and contributing. Despite working on several songs, none of them made the final album tracklisting.

Composition
Born Pink is twenty-four minutes long and consists of 8 songs. Three of the album's tracks are labelled explicit. It  features genres such as hip-hop, pop, disco, ballad, alt-pop, pop-rock, stadium rock, punk, EDM, bubblegum pop and classical interludes. As the creative directors, Blackpink worked with many producers, including Teddy Sinclair, Willy Sinclair, Bekuh Boom, R. Tee, Kush and  Teddy Park. The first half of the album contains lyrics that show the group's "extremely confident" and "untouchable exteriors", while the second half reveals the insecurities in "emotional charged" ballads. The uptempo, "English heavy" album was described as "faster" and "shinier" than its predecessor The Album.

Songs

The record opens with the pre-release single, "Pink Venom", a hip-hop based track that blends elements of traditional Korean instruments with EDM and pop-rap. Lyrically, it expresses Blackpink's confidence and dual identity as both sweet and deadly and the group's growing international popularity. The song includes several lyrical references from the 1990s and 2000s: Jennie opens the first verse with "Kick the door, waving the Coco", a play on the lyric "Kick in the door, wavin’ the .44" from the Notorious B.I.G.'s "Kick in the Door", while one of Lisa's verses interpolates the lyrics "One by one, then two by two" from Rihanna's debut single "Pon de Replay". "Shut Down" samples the classical composition "La Campanella", originally by Niccolò Paganini, mixed with hip hop and trap hooks, strings and an insistent bass sound. Lyrically it contains self-referential lyrics about the group's fame and success, while telling their haters and doubters "to take a seat".  Longtime collaborator Bekuh Boom primarily wrote and produced the third track "Typa Girl", an electronic hip-hop and pop song with a trap beat and strong 1980s sound that speaks "confidently" about being the "type" of person everyone wants and highlights "the potential of a different kind of music". 

Members Jisoo and Rosé participated in the writing process for the fourth track, the pop-rock, synth-pop and new wave "lush" love song "Yeah Yeah Yeah", which features retro synths in its arrangement and recalls 1980s music in its composition. Lyrically, the track is about the simultaneous confusion and excitement of falling in love with someone completely unexpected. The song "rides on a jagged guitar riff with lavish flourishes of over-the-top synth-disco." Park Jun-hee of The Star noted that "The disco-style tune that gives off '80s vibes enters the 50-second mark and sketches out a euphoric moment of young love and youthful energy. It reminds us of spending summer nights with a lover under the bright light of the moon". Many critics compared its production to the group's 2020 single "Lovesick Girls". Singer-songwriter Freddy Wexler contributed to the composition of the fifth track, "Hard to Love", as co-writer and co-producer, performed by member Rosé as a solo. The guitar pop track incorporates elements of 90's rock and roll, is led by soft piano and a "vintage intro that contrasts with the powerful rhythm of the drop beat", building into a lite-disco and pop-rock sound with funk-inspired guitar and bass groove. The lyrics talk about the honest but complex feeling of wanting to be loved by someone who is difficult to trust.

Teddy Sinclair and Willy Sinclair co-produced the sixth track, "The Happiest Girl". A downtempo piano ballad track characterized by grand piano instrumentals, the lyrics centers on the narrator's strong will to find happiness despite missing someone, using a "melancholic" melody to convey the desire for contentment. The rock infused ballad "Tally" is a midtempo pop song with elements of hip-hop and rock and "crunchy" guitar in the introduction. The lyrics discuss positivity and the beauty of achieving life's goals. The song "embodies a free, yet elegant mood", allowing the group to present their free spirit while speaking openly about the importance of being oneself. The closing track "Ready for Love" is a pop and dance-pop song with "sparkling" EDM chorus and horn flares with the likes of a house-pop "euphoric" instrumental. The song finds the group truly ready to leave their doubts behind and celebrate the future. On Born Pink as a whole, Park noted that "All the members have moments to shine, infusing a fresh sound into Blackpink's musical vessel".

Promotion and release 
Born Pink  was released worldwide on September 16, 2022, by YG Entertainment and Interscope Records.

Marketing
Two singles supported Born Pink. Blackpink released the first, "Pink Venom" on August 19, which they performed at the 2022 MTV Video Music Awards, making them the first female K-pop group in history to do so. It's music video reached 90.4 million views in 24 hours, surpassing the previous record held by their own song "How You Like That"  for the most-viewed video by a female artist in a single day. The second and lead single "Shut Down" was released alongside the album on September 16.  All two singles peaked in the top twenty-five of the US Billboard Hot 100, and  topped the Billboard Global 200 chart. "Ready for Love" was released as a promotional single on July 29, in collaboration with battle royale video game PUBG Mobile. 

On September 16, the group held a live stream broadcast on the group's official YouTube channel one hour before the release of Born Pink. During the broadcast, held on a large stage aligning with the concept of the second single "Shut Down", the members revealed a variety of behind-the-scenes stories of the music video filming, discuss their future activities, and introduce the new songs and sneak peeks into the Born Pink World Tour. On the same day, Blackpink was interviewed on US radio stations Sirius XM and 102.7 KIIS FM as part of promotions for both "Shut Down" and the new album. On September 19, they performed the single live for the first time on ABC's Jimmy Kimmel Live!. From September 16 to 18, Spotify held an event called "Born Pink: The Pop-Up Experience" in Los Angeles to celebrate the new album's release, where attendees had the opportunity to enjoy photographic moments selected by the members, buy exclusive Blackpink products directly in-store and receive an exclusive gift from Spotify and Blackpink. On December 2, Blackpink released the first episode of Born Pink Memories, a reality show on YouTube showing the behind-the-scenes process of the album and its promotions.

Tour
 
On July 6, 2022, YG Entertainment confirmed that Blackpink would embark on the largest world tour by a K-pop girl group in history later in the year. On July 31, it was revealed that the group's second Korean studio album Born Pink would release in September, supported by the Born Pink World Tour starting in October. On August 8, Blackpink announced 36 tour dates between October 2022 and June 2023 spanning Asia, North America, Europe, and Oceania. The tour began on October 15, 2022, at the KSPO Dome in Seoul, South Korea.

Artwork and packaging 
Born Pink was released in three
different physical formats—a box set version, a kit album, and a vinyl record—as well as digital download. The box set version has pink, black, and gray variations, each with a packing box, 80-page photobook, accordion lyrics sheet, photocards, postcards, two instant films and a sticker.
The kit album, which allows buyers to listen to the album on their smartphones, contains a set of twelve photo cards, lyric and credit sheet, and a random polaroid card. The pink vinyl is special-edition is set to released on December 30, 2022. A fourth physical format, called "digipacks", were announced on August 21, 2022; they come in four versions, one for each member, and was released on September 16.

The album was reportedly made with Forest Stewardship Council-certified low-carbon eco-friendly paper, soybean oil ink, and eco-friendly coating. In addition, in its kit format, the disc is made of biodegradable plastic (PLA), and the plastic of the packaging and bag are made of ecological resin extracted from corn starch. The digital cover art consists of two pink fangs that appear from the top against a white background. The group's name and album's title are shown under them in a grey font.

Critical reception 

Born Pink was met with generally favorable reviews from music critics. At Metacritic, which assigns a normalized rating out of 100 to reviews from mainstream publications, the album received a weighted average score of 70 based on 9 reviews, indicating "generally favorable reviews".

Rob Sheffield of Rolling Stone proclaimed it "the landmark pop album Blackpink were born to make" and praised the songs as "high-impact bangers and ferocious rock & roll anthems." Park Jun-hee of The Korea Herald described listening to the album as "biting into a trick candy: You don’t know what they’ll bring out this time, but it'll always be a sweet surprise." Vince Ferreras from CNN Philippines called the album as the group's most mature release to date and the one that shows the quartet's notable artistic growth the most. The Telegraph'''s writer Emma Madden described Born Pink as a "sound of the biggest girlgroup on the planet" where they "marry the very best of Western pop music" with "a romantic, gleefully chaotic South Korean sensibility". In her review for AllMusic, Neil Z. Yeung felt Born Pink "matures Blackpink with stronger production, more personal lyrics, and a bold conviction that cannot be contained".  The Harvard Crimsons Alisa S. Regassa praised the album's innovative production and songwriting and felt that it pushed the boundaries of the K-pop industry. Billboard included Born Pink in their list of the 50 best albums of 2022, noting that it showcased "a more mature, grown-up version of the group."Pitchforks Alex Ramos noted that rather than following in the steps of “Pink Venom” by experimenting, the rest of the album features "more of the same". Writing for NME, Tanu I. Raj stated that on the album Blackpink treads the well-known thematic territory of pop music, but the imagery of "finding solace from heartbreak at the bottom of a bottle" or "boasting about being the type of girl you take to your 'mama house'" isn’t particularly novel.

Billboard, Rolling Stone, and Uproxx named Born Pink one of the best albums released in 2022. Its singles, "Pink Venom" and "Shut Down", were also named amongst best songs of 2022.

 Year-end lists 

Awards and nominations

 Commercial performance 
On August 18, 2022, YG Entertainment confirmed that Born Pink surpassed 1.5 million pre-orders in six days, followed by an announcement notifying that the album had sold over two million copies in pre-orders on August 25, making it the first album by a K-pop female act to achieve the milestone. Following its release, Born Pink became the first album by a K-pop girl group to sell over one million copies on its first day on Hanteo, doing it in less than 12 hours. Born Pink debuted at number one on the Circle Album Chart with 2,141,281 copies sold in less than two days of tracking and became the first album by a K-pop girl group to sell over two million copies. The kit version of the album debuted at number four with 59,718 copies sold. The album also topped the monthly Circle Album Chart, selling 2,457,206 copies as well as 60,000 copies of the kit version in the month of September.

All eight tracks on the album collectively drew 371.5 million streams and sold 55,000 downloads worldwide and went on to debut in the top half of the Billboard Global 200 and the top-forty of the Global Excl. U.S. in the week ending September 22. Both "Pink Venom" and "Shut Down" peaked at number one on the Global 200 and Global Excl. U.S., making Born Pink the third album after Sour and Be to yield multiple Global 200 chart-toppers and the second after Be to yield multiple Global Excl. U.S. chart-toppers.  According to the International Federation of the Phonographic Industry (IFPI), the album was the eighth best-selling album worldwide in 2022, marking Blackpink's first album to rank in the top ten.

In the United States, Born Pink debuted at number one on the Billboard 200 with 102,000 album-equivalent units, including 75,500 pure album sales, 25,000 stream-equivalent sales (resulting from 37.49 million on-demand streams), and 1,500 track-equivalent sales. It became the first album by a female Korean act to top the chart and the first album by a female group to do so since Danity Kane's Welcome to the Dollhouse in 2008. The album also debuted atop the Top Album Sales chart with 75,500 copies sold, which comprised 64,000 CD sales and 11,500 digital sales, earning the seventh-largest sales week of any album in 2022. Blackpink became the eighth all-female group in history to top the Billboard 200, following Diana Ross & The Supremes, The Go-Go's, Spice Girls, TLC, The Chicks, Destiny’s Child and Danity Kane. In its second week, the album descended to number four with 40,000 album-equivalent units, including 26,000 pure album sales. In the United Kingdom, Born Pink also became the first album by a K-pop girl group to reach number one on the UK Albums Chart. It marked the first time a girl group simultaneously topped the album charts in the United States and United Kingdom since Destiny's Child's Survivor in 2001. Born Pink also topped the charts in Canada and Portugal and reached the top ten in Australia, Netherlands, France, Germany, Lithuania, Sweden and Norway.

 Track listing 

PersonnelMusicians Blackpink – creative directors
 Kim Jisoo – vocals (all tracks except 5), lyricist (track 4)
 Jennie Kim – vocals (all tracks except 5)
 Roseanne Park – vocals (all tracks), lyricist (track 4)
 Lalisa Manobal – vocals (all tracks except 5)
 Teddy Park – creative director, lyricist (tracks 1, 2, 5 and 8), composition (tracks 1, 2, 5 and 8)
 24 – composition (tracks 1, 2, 5–8), keyboard 1 (tracks 1, 2, 5 – 8)
 R. Tee – composition (tracks 1, 4 and 5), keyboard 2 (tracks 1, 4, 5)
 Danny Chung – lyricist (tracks 1, 2, 7, and 8)
 Vince – lyricist (track 2)
 Bekuh Boom – lyricist (track 3), composition (tracks 3 and 8)
 Dominsuk – composition (track 3), keyboard  (track 3)
 Kush – lyricist (track 4), composition (tracks 4 and 8), keyboard (track 4)
 VVN – lyricist (track 4, 8), composition (tracks 4 and 8)
 Ido – drums (tracks 1 and 4)
 Freddy Wexler – lyricist (track 5), composition (track 5)
 Bianca "Blush" Atterberry – lyricist (track 5), composition (track 5)
 Max Wolfgang – lyricist (track 5), composition (track 5)
 Teddy Sinclair – lyricist (track 6), composition (track 6)
 Willy Sinclair – lyricist (track 6), composition (track 6)
 Paro – lyricist (track 6), composition (track 6)
 Nat Dunn – lyricist (track 7), composition (track 7)
 David Phelan – lyricist (track 7), composition (track 7)
 Alex Oriet – lyricist (track 7), composition (track 7)
 Brian Lee – lyricist (track 7), composition (track 7)
 Soraya LaPread – lyricist (track 7)
 Chloe – chorus (tracks 4, 5, 6)
 Lyn – chorus (tracks 7)
 Janghan Yoon – guitar (track 5)
 Taeyoon Lee – bass (track 5)
 Nohc —  electronic piano (track 5), piano (track 6)
 Kay Brown (Sunghyun Kim) – guitar (track 7)Technical'''
 Teddy Park – producer (tracks 1 and 8)
 24 – arrangement (tracks 1, 2, 5–8), producer (tracks 1, 2, 5–8), mix engineer (track 1)
 R. Tee – arrangement (tracks 1, 4 and 5), producer (tracks 1, 4 and 5), mix engineer (track 1)
 IDO – arrangement (tracks 1 and 4), producer (tracks 1 and 4), mix engineer (track 1)
 Bekuh Boom – producer (track 3)
 Dominsuk – arrangement (track 3)
 Kush – arrangement (track 4), producer (track 4)
 Freddy Wexler – producer (track 5)
 Nohc – arrangement (track 6), producer (track 6)
 Teddy Sinclair – producer (track 6)
 Willy Sinclair – producer (track 6)
 Josh Gudwin – mix engineer (all tracks)

Charts

Weekly charts

Monthly charts

Year-end charts

Certifications and sales

Release history

See also 
 List of best-selling albums in South Korea
 List of Billboard 200 number-one albums of 2022
 List of certified albums in South Korea
 List of Circle Album Chart number ones of 2022
 Lists of fastest-selling albums
 List of K-pop albums on the Billboard charts
 List of number-one albums of 2022 (Canada)
 List of number-one albums of 2022 (Portugal)
 List of UK Albums Chart number ones of the 2020s

Notes

References 

2022 albums
Blackpink albums
YG Entertainment albums
Interscope Records albums
Hip hop albums by South Korean artists
Pop albums by South Korean artists